William Still (born 14 October 1992) is a Belgian professional football manager and former player who is the manager of  club Reims.

Early life
Will Still was born on 14 October 1992 in Braine-l'Alleud, Belgium to English parents who left the United Kingdom two years earlier. His father worked for Shell. Still has two brothers, Nicolas and Edward, both also active in football.

Growing up in the Walloon region, near Brussels, he went to a French language school and then learned Dutch by playing for Flemish football clubs. He went through Sint-Truiden and Mons youth teams, and finally played for Mons reserve team and amateur club Tempo Overijse, back then playing the Belgian Fourth Division. 

Still has stated that playing the Football Manager and Championship Manager video game series helped him to decide to switch focus from playing at the age of 17, and move to England to start studying to become a coach at Myerscough College in Preston, Lancashire. 

Still is a fan of Premier League club West Ham United.

Managerial career

Early career
Still started his career as assistant of the U14 manager of Preston North End. At that club he did an internship as part of his football studies at Myerscough College. In 2014, he became video analyst at Sint-Truiden, after successfully using a match analysis to convince manager Yannick Ferrera. In 2015, the team were promoted to the Belgian First Division A, but when Ferrera switched to Standard Liège, Still followed him. That season, Standard Liège won the Belgian Cup, but in September 2016, both Ferrera and his assistants were sacked.

Lierse
In April 2017, Still started a new position at second division team Lierse, combining the video analyst job with the assignment as assistant manager of Frederik Vanderbiest. In June 2017, Still returned to Standard Liège, only to leave two days later as his new club did not want to fulfill the agreed upon arrangements as part of the contract negotiations.

Still was able to immediately return to Lierse, where (at just 24 years of age) he was even appointed caretaker manager from October as Vanderbiest got sacked. Eventually, Lierse employed Still as full-time manager. Still managed to guide the team to 21 points out of 27, including a seven-game winning streak. The 2–0 victory against Westerlo of 2 December 2017 became his last match as head coach however, as he did not possess the "UEFA A-level coach" degree, which is required in the Belgian First Division B to remain in charge for more than 60 days. Still stayed with Lierse but became the assistant of David Colpaert.

Beerschot
At the end of the 2017–18 season, Lierse was declared bankrupt. Still left for Beerschot to become assistant of Stijn Vreven. Under his successor, Hernán Losada, Beerschot and Still were promoted to the Belgian First Division A. After Losada left mid-January 2021 to start as head coach of D.C. United, Still became the new manager of Beerschot. At the end of the 2020–21 season, despite finishing 9th, Beerschot's owners decided to hire the more experienced Peter Maes to take them into the next season.

Reims
Following his departure from Beerschot, Still joined Ligue 1 team Reims as assistant to manager Óscar García. Following four months in France, Still was offered roles at two Belgian clubs and chose to return to Standard Liège. Still explained that part of the reasoning behind this was the fact that his UEFA pro license was registered in Belgium, so he was having to drive back and forth between Belgium and Reims to attend courses, which was becoming a strain on his time.

At the end of the 2021–22 season, Still got a call back from Reims, to go back to the Ligue 1 side as an assistant manager. After García was sacked on 13 October 2022, Still took over as caretaker manager. Following an undefeated stretch of five games, he was appointed as manager for the rest of the 2022–23 season, becoming the youngest manager in Europe's top five leagues at 30 years of age. Due to him not holding a UEFA Pro Licence, Reims get fined €25,000 for every match Still manages.

He started his tenure as head coach at Reims with a 14-game unbeaten streak in all competitions until a 3–1 defeat against Toulouse in the Coupe de France round of 16, including two draws against league leaders Paris Saint-Germain. With a 1–0 win against Monaco on 12 March 2023, Still extended his unbeaten start in the league as Reims manager to 17 matches setting a new Ligue 1 record. He also became just the second manager to reach this mark in top-five European leagues in the 21st century, following Tito Vilanova with 18 matches at Barcelona in 2012–13.

Managerial statistics

References

1992 births
Living people
People from Braine-l'Alleud
Belgian footballers
Association footballers not categorized by position
Belgian football managers
Lierse S.K. managers
Beerschot A.C. managers
Stade de Reims managers
Belgian Pro League managers
Ligue 1 managers
Belgian expatriate football managers
Expatriate football managers in France
Belgian expatriates in France
Association football coaches
Preston North End F.C. non-playing staff
Standard Liège non-playing staff
Stade de Reims non-playing staff
Beerschot A.C. non-playing staff
Belgian people of English descent